Altena is a municipality in the Netherlands, on a river island in the very north of the province of North Brabant, bordering the provinces of Gelderland and South Holland. Nearby cities are Dordrecht in the west, Gorinchem in the north (both in South Holland), and Waalwijk in the south.

Approximately 56,000 people live in an area of about 201 km², making Altena the largest municipality of North Brabant in terms of land area (surpassing Meierijstad).

Geography 
The municipality was formed on 1 January 2019, by the merger of the municipalities of Aalburg, Werkendam, and Woudrichem. Aalburg was only a municipality, Werkendam and Woudrichem are also population centres. Werkendam is the largest town, and the small city of Woudrichem the historical centre of Altena. The village of Almkerk serves as the municipal seat and lies in the middle of the municipality.

Altena can be characterized as a rural community with population centres mainly concentrated along the surrounding waterways. These waterways are (clockwise, starting in the west): Nieuwe Merwede, Boven Merwede, Afgedamde Maas, Heusdensch Kanaal, Bergsche Maas, and Amer.

De Biesbosch National Park is partially situated in the western part of Altena.

The municipality of Altena is to a large extent identical to the region of the Land van Heusden en Altena. Only De Biesbosch area, existing of the aforementioned De Biesbosch National Park and polders above, falls outside. Waterway Steurgat largely forms the boundary.

Population centres 
The municipality of Altena officially has 1 city, 18 villages, and 27 hamlets. However, many villages are the size of a hamlet, and Werkendam and Woudrichem are the size of towns, the latter also having city rights.

City
 Woudrichem

Villages

Hamlets

Topography 

Dutch topographic map of the municipality of Altena, 2020

Transport 
Altena is accessible by bridges and ferries. Important bridges are the northern Merwede Bridge  and the southern Keizersveer Bridge. Both bridges are part of motorway A27, which crosses the municipality from north to south.

A car ferry in the very western part connects the city of Dordrecht with Altena.

Nearest railway station is Gorinchem railway station in the municipality of Gorinchem, above Altena on the other side of the Boven Merwede river.

History and religion 
Altena is the southernmost part of the Dutch Water Line, an obsolete defensive line, which contains several fortresses in this municipality like Fort Steurgat, Fort aan de Uppelse Dijk, and Fort Giessen, and with Woudrichem as a fortified city.

Contrary to most other North Brabant municipalities, Protestantism is dominant in the Altena municipality, especially the Calvinist branch. Church attendance is high, and Christian oriented political parties receive many votes.

Politics 
The municipal council consists of:

The municipal executive consists of CDA, Altena Lokaal, SGP, and Progressief Lokaal. Mayor has been CDA politician Egbert Lichtenberg (since 9 December 2019).

Sports 
Several football clubs have their home base in the municipality:
 Achilles Veen in Veen
 GRC '14 in Giessen
 Kozakken Boys in Werkendam
 VV Almkerk in Almkerk

Each year the 7-Dorpenomloop Aalburg, a prestigious women's road bicycle race, is being held in the southeast corner of Altena (the area of the former municipality of Aalburg, hence the name).

Notable people 
 Jan Hendrik van den Berg (1914–2012), psychiatrist
 Erik Braal (born 1971), basketball coach
 Hendrikus Colijn (1869–1944), prime minister
 Leendert Antonie Donker (1899–1956), minister of Justice
 Louwrens Hanedoes (1822–1905), landscape painter
 Hans van Helden (born 1948), speed skater
 Adri van Heteren (born 1951), politician and Christian minister (in Werkendam)
 Cornelis Pieter van den Hoek (1921–2015), resistance fighter (line-crosser)
 Louis van Iersel (1893–1987), American sergeant of World War I
 Ricardo Ippel (born 1990), footballer
 Rebekka Kadijk (born 1979), (beach) volleyball player
 Jan Lohman (born 1959), footballer
 Anton Mussert (1894–1946), civil engineer, political leader and war criminal
 Hans Oerlemans (born 1950), climatologist
 Leo van der Pluym (born 1935), cyclist
 Marieke Lucas Rijneveld (born 1991), writer
 Elsbeth van Rooy-Vink (born 1973), cyclist
 Jan Nico Scholten (born 1932), politician (mayor of Andel, Giessen, and Rijswijk)
 Carola Schouten (born 1977), minister of Agriculture 
 Raymond Schouten (born 1985), motorcycle racer
 Kees Stoop (1929–2019), painter
 Edwin Straver (1971–2020), motorcycle racer
 Henri Karel Frederik van Teijn (1839–1892), general and governor
 Gijsbert van Tienhoven (1841–1914), prime minister
 Hermanus Eliza Verschoor (1791–1877), politician (mayor of De Werken en Sleeuwijk)
 Mart Visser (born 1968), fashion designer
 Niels Vorthoren (born 1988), footballer
 Marianne Vos (born 1987), cyclist

References

External links

Official website

 
Land van Heusden en Altena
Municipalities of North Brabant
Municipalities of the Netherlands established in 2019